Ese, or Managalasi, is a language of Oro Province, Papua New Guinea. Dialects are Muaturaina, Chimona, Dea, Akabafa, Nami, Mesari, Averi, Afore, Minjori, Oko, Wakue, Numba, Jimuni, Karira. Perhaps 40% of speakers are monolingual.

It is spoken in the Kawawoki Mission area of Popondetta.

Phonology

Consonants 

 Allophones of phonemes /β, tɕ, dʑ, ɾ/ exist as [b, ts, ɖʐ, ɺ].

Vowels 

 A central vowel sound [ʉ] can be heard as a result of /i/ preceding /u/.
 Allophones of /e, a, o/, exist as [ɛ ə ɔ].
 A semivowel sound [w] occurs when /u/ precedes a stressed vowel.

Further reading
Parlier, James. 1970. Managalasi sentences. Manuscript. Ukarumpa: SIL-PNG.
Parlier, Judith and James Parlier. 1981. Managalasi Dictionary. Ukarumpa: SIL-PNG.

References

Languages of Papua New Guinea
Koiarian languages